Scottsboro may refer to:
 Scottsboro, Alabama, United States
 Scottsboro, Georgia, United States
 The Scottsboro Boys, involved in a racially charged legal case that made it to the United States Supreme Court
 Scottsboro: A Novel, a 2008 novel by Ellen Feldman nominated for the Orange Prize for Fiction
 Scottsboro: An American Tragedy, a 2001 documentary about the above legal case